Frank Grimes (born 1947) is an Irish stage and screen actor.

Grimes was born in Dublin. He achieved his first major success as the young Brendan Behan in the 1967 stage adaptation of Behan's autobiography, Borstal Boy, at the Abbey Theatre. When the production moved to Broadway, Grimes was nominated for a Tony Award for best actor.

In 1970 the Italian director, Franco Zeffirelli, offered Grimes the lead role of Francis of Assisi in his biopic, Brother Sun, Sister Moon. However, director and actor fell out over how the part should be played and Grimes was replaced by Graham Faulkner.

In the early 1970s, Grimes moved to London where he came to the attention of director Lindsay Anderson. Anderson offered him a part in his production of David Storey's play The Farm, the success of which established Grimes' reputation in British theatre.

Grimes' most significant film role to date is the part of Major Fuller in Richard Attenborough's A Bridge Too Far (1977). However, he is probably best known, in his native Ireland at least, for his performance as Father O'Connor in RTÉ's drama series, Strumpet City. In 1981, Grimes received a Jacob's Award "for his detailed and exceptionally convincing portrayal" of the young priest.

Frank Grimes continues to work in television, films and theatre. Recent TV appearances include the recurrent role of Barry Connor in Coronation Street. In 2013 he appeared as Mrs McCarthy's husband in the Father Brown episode "The Mayor and the Magician".

Filmography

References

External links
Frank Grimes at Irish Playography

1947 births
Living people
Irish male stage actors
Irish male film actors
Irish male television actors
Jacob's Award winners
People from Cabra, Dublin